Lunenburg is a town in Essex County, Vermont, United States. The population was 1,246 at the 2020 census, the most populous in Essex County. Lunenburg contains the villages of West Lunenburg, South Lunenburg, Mill Village (Northern Lunenburg) and Gilman, and is part of the Berlin, NH–VT Micropolitan Statistical Area.

History 
Lunenburg was  granted by Benning Wentworth, the royal governor of New Hampshire, on July 5, 1763 to David Page and 68 other people. It is widely believed that David Page named the town, which stems from one of the titles for Prince Karl Wilhelm Ferdinand of Brunswick-Lunenburg. Lunenburg was the home of Vermont State Representative Adino Nye Bell. Lunenburg is also believed to have inspired the Robert Frost poem "The Mountain", which takes place in a town called Lunenburg.

Geography

Lunenburg is in southern Essex County along the Connecticut River, the border between Vermont and New Hampshire. It is bordered to the west by the town of Concord, to the northwest by Victory, at its northernmost point by Granby, and to the northeast by Guildhall, all in Vermont. Across the Connecticut, to the east is the town of Lancaster, New Hampshire, and to the south is the town of Dalton, New Hampshire. U.S. Route 2 crosses through the center of Lunenburg, leading west to St. Johnsbury and east to Lancaster and Gorham, New Hampshire. The Mount Orne Covered Bridge is in the eastern part of town, crossing the Connecticut to South Lancaster, New Hampshire.

Neal Pond, north of the town center, is the largest body of water. There are also four brooks—Neal Brook, Mink Brook, Catbow Brook, and Hudson Brook—all of which feed into the Connecticut River. There are also smaller creeks throughout the town. The highest point is  Temple Mountain in the northern part of town.

Demographics

As of the census of 2000, there were 1,328 people, 516 households, and 366 families living in the town. The population density was 29.5 people per square mile (11.4/km2). There were 747 housing units at an average density of 16.6 per square mile (6.4/km2). The racial makeup of the town was 97.82% White, 0.08% African American, 0.68% Native American, 0.08% Asian, and 1.36% from two or more races. Hispanic or Latino of any race were 0.38% of the population.

There were 516 households, out of which 33.5% had children under the age of 18 living with them, 57.0% were married couples living together, 8.5% had a female householder with no husband present, and 28.9% were non-families. 21.7% of all households were made up of individuals, and 9.7% had someone living alone who was 65 years of age or older. The average household size was 2.55 and the average family size was 2.97.

In the town, the population was spread out, with 26.4% under the age of 18, 7.1% from 18 to 24, 29.1% from 25 to 44, 23.1% from 45 to 64, and 14.4% who were 65 years of age or older. The median age was 37 years. For every 100 females, there were 103.1 males. For every 100 females age 18 and over, there were 98.8 males.

The median income for a household in the town was $28,802, and the median income for a family was $33,000. Males had a median income of $26,793 versus $18,594 for females. The per capita income for the town was $12,804. About 8.7% of families and 12.6% of the population were below the poverty line, including 15.0% of those under age 18 and 9.9% of those age 65 or over.

Presidential Election Results

References

External links 

 
Towns in Vermont
Berlin, New Hampshire micropolitan area
Vermont populated places on the Connecticut River
Towns in Essex County, Vermont